The Dhimmi: Jews and Christians Under Islam is a book by Bat Ye'or.
The book was first published in French in 1980, and was titled Le Dhimmi : Profil de l'opprimé en Orient et en Afrique du Nord depuis la conquête Arabe (The Dhimmi: Profile of the oppressed in the Orient and in North Africa since the Arab conquest). It was translated into English and published in 1985 under the name The Dhimmi: Jews and Christians Under Islam.

Thesis and structure 
Bat Ye'or argues that the category of the "dhimmi" is an inferior status and compares dhimmitude to the ill-treatment of minorities in Christian lands (Muslim and Jewish). The book also contends that the safety of dhimmis in Arab lands has been fragile and at constant risk for centuries. To bolster her case, Ye'or provides a selection of primary sources describing cruel treatment of non-Muslims by Muslims.

In the first part of the book, the author provides a historical survey of the effects and consequences that living under Islamic rule, or using the term coined here, in "dhimmitude", had on the Jewish and Christian communities in the Middle East.

The second part contains correspondence and testimonies from inside and outside observers over the centuries, including speeches from various influential Arabs, texts from various middle-age sources, and eyewitness reports by British consuls. Some of these were made available in European languages for the first time with the publication of the book. It also contains rare pictures and photographs depicting religious minority community under Islamic rule. Through these documents, Bat Ye'or gives her representation of the views of Islamic theologians and jurists on the treatment of non-Muslim populations in lands ruled by Muslims from the 7th century onwards.

Reception
In a 2006 review article discussing antisemitism in Muslim lands, Gudrun Krämer notes that in contrast to the "white myth" of continuous peaceful coexistence between different religious groups under Islamic rule, the portrayal offered in Ye'or's book is that of the "black myth". Krämer describes both positions as irrelevant.

Professor of Medieval Islamic history, David Waines, in a 1987 review of an English edition, writes that the "portrait of the dhimmi, however, is executed in monochrome." If the book portrayed the actual situation, he notes, it would be "inconceivable that the rich Judeo-Islamic cultural tradition of the middle ages could ever have been created." He also strongly criticises what he perceives as a bias in the selection of primary sources and its political aims in undermining Palestinian Arab claims to land rights.

Reviewing the English edition of the book for The Jewish Quarterly Review in 1986, Leon Nemoy, curator of Hebrew and Arabic literature at Yale's Sterling Memorial Library, wrote that while one might disagree "here and there" with the major thesis propounded by Bat Ye'or, it cannot be dismissed as "a pack of lies" since her documented evidence comes from "highly reliable testimonies".

Allan Harris Cutler and Hellen Cutler reviewed the book in 1985 and wrote that it is a "documentary history of Islamic antagonism toward Christians and Jews." They also note that more positive views of the relationship between Muslims and dhimmis exist among authoritative scholars.

Paul Fenton, while reviewing the French edition of the book and another book by Norman A. Stillman ("The Jews of Arab Lands: A History and Source Book") in 1981, noticed that "The need for a serious and objective source book on the history of the Jews in Arab lands untainted by ideological options, has long been felt by students of Middle Eastern history. The two titles under review both respond to this need albeit in quite different, if not complementary, manners."

References

External links
Introduction to The Dhimmi: Jews and Christians Under Islam by Bat Ye'or
  Preface to The Dhimmi: Jews and Christians Under Islam by Bat Ye'or

History books about Islam
1985 non-fiction books
1980 non-fiction books
History books about Jews and Judaism
Books about antisemitism
Islam and other religions
Islam and antisemitism
Eurabia